Mari Kvien Brunvoll (released 2012 by Jazzland Recordings – 371 627-8) is the debut album of the Norwegian singer Mari Kvien Brunvoll, recorded February 2010 at the "12 Points Festival", Stavanger, Norway by Per Ravnaas and Kaj Hjertenes at NRK Musikkteknikk. "Is It Love" and "Joanna" was recorded July 2010, at Clusone Jazz Festival, Italy. "Oh How Much" was recorded November 2009, at the Bimhuis in Amsterdam, Netherlands, by Marc Broer and Willem Feenstra of NTR Radio. All music performed live in concert by Mari Kvien Brunvoll.

Personnel 
Mari Kvien Brunvoll - voice, live sampling, electronics, kalimba, zither, percussion

Track listing 
«Sweet Mysterious» (7:08)
«Everywhere You Go» (7:38)
«I'm Going Don't You Know» (2:49)
«Wake Up» (5:33)
«Is It Love» (6:08)
«Joanna» (4:20)
«Oh How Much» (4:19)
«Something Inside» (6:48)

Credits 
Design – Elida Brenna Linge
Mastered at Lunds Lyd by – Morten Lund
Mixed at Studio 5071 by – Morten Skage
Photography (Live) by – Oliver Heisch
Recorded by – Kai Hjertenes (tracks: 1-4, 8), Marc Broer (tracks: 7), Per Ravnaas (tracks: 1-4, 8), Willem Feenstra (tracks: 7)
Photography, Design & Written by – Mari Kvien Brunvoll
Written by – Memphis Minnie (tracks: 2-3)

References

External links 
Mari Kvien Brunvoll on Jazzland Recordings

Mari Kvien Brunvoll albums
1995 live albums